Syedana Nasiruddin Sailani Badesha was a sufi saint of the Chishti Order. He arrived in India in 857 a.h. (1453 AD) by the blessings and order of Khaja Garibnawaz. He settled in Koppal and began teaching there.  He was respected by many people, including kings.

He was martyred in 911 a.h. (1507 AD) while prostrating during namaz e asar (afternoon prayer) in his hujra (small chamber or cell). He was buried where he was martyred. His son, Syed Zinda Hussain al Hussaini, succeeded him.

To this day, 500 years after his death, his spiritual and genealogical descendants carry out his work. His 21st and present Sajjada Nashin (successor representative) is Syed Shah Hussamuddin Hussaini Niazi. Many people of all castes and creeds still visit his qannqahs (shrines) in Koppal, Hospet, Bijapur, and Tenahalli.

Indian Sufi saints
People from Koppal